Thomas Floutz is an American make-up artist and special effects artist. He was nominated for an Academy Award in the category Best Makeup and Hairstyling for the film Hellboy II: The Golden Army. Floutz also won two Primetime Emmy Awards and was nominated for four more in the category Outstanding Makeup.

Selected filmography 
 Hellboy II: The Golden Army (2008; co-nominated with Mike Elizalde)

References

External link 

Living people
Year of birth missing (living people)
Place of birth missing (living people)
American make-up artists
Special effects people
Primetime Emmy Award winners